Love Me is the debut single of Buddy Holly. It was released on April 16, 1956, on the Decca Label, backed by "Blue Days - Black Nights". The single was the result of Holly's first recording session at Bradley's Barn in Nashville. Due to creative differences, the song represented a more country sound than Holly liked and, paired with lack of promotion, was a commercial failure.

Background
Decca expressed interest in Holly after observing his group, Buddy and Bob, featuring Bob Montgomery on guitar and Larry Welborn on bass. Holly was signed, with the hope of capitalizing on rock and roll's prominence. Montgomery was rejected by Decca because his voice was deemed "too country", and Welborn was unable to travel due to school. Holly assembled a new band to record at Bradley's Barn, consisting of Sonny Curtis on guitar and Don Guess on bass.

The group recorded "Love Me", written by Holly and Sue Parrish, a Lubbock native, "Don't Come Back Knockin'", "Blue Days - Black Nights", written by Ben Hall, another Lubbock native, and "Midnight Shift". Recording took place between 7 and 10 PM on January 26, 1956. The band was supplemented by session musicians Doug Kirkham and Grady Martin.

Release
The single was released on April 16, 1956, on Decca Records, as a 7" and 10" single. Due to an inadvertent misspelling on Holly's recording contract, his name was changed from Holley to Holly. The release was the first to use that spelling, which Holly used for the rest of his career. Executives weren't pleased with the results. However, the single garnered a positive review in Billboard Magazine, and managed to sell upwards of 19,000 copies. The record received a B+ review in Cashbox magazine. The single was followed by "Modern Don Juan" b/w "You Are My One Desire" on December 24, 1956.

Despite Holly's shortcomings at Decca, the label capitalized on the musician after he found success with the Crickets and later as a solo artist in 1957. "Love Me" was re-released on January 7, 1958, this time backed by "You Are My One Desire", which again failed to chart. "Love Me" was included, along with other songs from the Nashville recordings on the album That'll Be The Day, released in April 1958.

Personnel
Buddy Holly - vocals
Sonny Curtis - lead guitar
Grady Martin - rhythm guitar
Don Guess - bass
Doug Kirkham - drums

References

External links

1956 debut singles
1956 songs
Buddy Holly songs